The Exceptional Public Achievement Medal  is an award of the National Aeronautics and Space Administration (NASA) . It is awarded to any non-Government individual or to any individual who was not a Government employee during the period in which the service was performed. The award is for a significant specific achievement or substantial improvement in operations, efficiency, service, financial savings, science, or technology which contributes to the mission of NASA.

To be awarded the medal, a NASA employee must fulfill the following criteria: work-related achievements yielding high-quality results and/or substantial improvement that supports the Agency mission; innovative approaches used in the conception, design, or execution of the individual's work; and/or impact and importance of the individual's achievement that made a significant contribution that enables NASA to accomplish its mission.

Notable recipients
National Symphony Conductor Emil de Cou (2012)
June Lockhart (2013)
Bill Prady (2013)
Stephen Colbert (2015)
Sir Ridley Scott (2016)
Begoña Vila (2016)

See also
 List of NASA awards

References

External links
 NASA awards
 National Aeronautics and Space Administration Honor Awards (1969-1978)

Exceptional Service Medal
Awards established in 1959
1959 establishments in the United States